Brenda Carla Rapp professor and chair of the Department of Cognitive Neuroscience at Krieger School of Arts and Sciences, Johns Hopkins University. In 2010, she was appointed joint editor-in-chief of the journal Cognitive Neuropsychology.

Early life and education 
Rapp is originally from Madrid, Spain.

During the summer after completing high school, Rapp grew interested in helping children with learning and language disabilities. She pursued a Special Education degree at the University of Maryland.

Rapp gained her doctorate in psychology in 1990 from Johns Hopkins University. She has worked there since.

Research and career 
Rapp's main research interests are written word production (spelling) and dysgraphia (spelling problems).

Rapp has published over 150 papers in scientific journals, such as the Brain, Cognitive Neuropsychology and Frontiers in Psychology, and has been cited over 6,000 times. She has commented on her research findings in various media outlets, including The Guardian, CNN and the Baltimore Sun.

Bibliography 
Books
 

Journals
  (Guest editors)
  (Guest editors)

References

External links 
 

American cognitive neuroscientists
Developmental psychologists
Johns Hopkins University alumni
Johns Hopkins University faculty
Living people
American women neuroscientists
Year of birth missing (living people)
American women academics
21st-century American women scientists